The 1967 Open Championship was the 96th Open Championship, played from 12–15 July at Royal Liverpool Golf Club, Hoylake. Roberto De Vicenzo, 44, won his only major championship, two strokes ahead of runner-up and defending champion Jack Nicklaus.

This was the last year until 1986 in which The Open had a single cut at 36 holes. From 1968 through 1985, a second cut was made after 54 holes.

The PGA Championship was played the next week near Denver, Colorado, one of five times in the 1960s that these two majors were played in consecutive weeks in July.

This was the last Open at Hoylake for 39 years, until 2006.

Past champions in the field

Made the cut

Missed the cut

Round summaries

First round
Wednesday, 12 July 1967

Second round
Thursday, 13 July 1967

Amateurs: Benka (+6), Howard (+7), Carr (+11), Falkenburg (+12), Sweeny Jnr (+12), Bonallack (+17), Broadbent (+17), Cosh (+30).

Third round
Friday, 14 July 1967

Final round
Saturday, 15 July 1967

Source:

References

External links
Royal Liverpool 1967 (Official site)

The Open Championship
Golf tournaments in England
Sport in the Metropolitan Borough of Wirral
Open Championship
Open Championship
Open Championship